Dudda is a small village in Hassan district of Karnataka state in India.

Location
Dudda is located 16 km from Hassan on the Arsikere road. It is 176 kilometres from the state capital of Bangalore.

Transportation
There is a railway station at Dudda.

Post Office
There is a post office at Dudda and the PIN Code is 573118.

References

Villages in Hassan district